Rytis Rimdeika (born 2 May 1966) is a Lithuanian medical doctor, scientist and professor.  He was the Head of Department of Plastic and Reconstructive Surgery, Lithuanian University of Health Sciences, from 2006-2021.

Biography 
He studied at the former Kaunas Medical Academy, which has since merged into the Lithuanian University of Health Sciences, graduating in 1990.  He then became a plastic and reconstructive surgeon in the academy's hospital.

From 1995–1999 he continued with his PhD studies in Kaunas University of Medicine's surgical department. .In 1999, he  defended his thesis, Chirurginių metodų veiksmingumas gydant riboto ploto gilius nudegimus.

From 2001–2006,  he was head of the plastic surgery and burns department in Kaunas University of Medicine hospital.

Rimdeika began his academic career as an assistant lecturer in Kaunas University of Medicine in 1995,  becoming lecturer in 1999 and associate professor in 2002. He became professor in 2006, and was also named Head of the Department of Plastic and Reconstructive Surgery in that year.

From 2016-2020, he was President of the Lithuanian Plastic and Reconstructive Surgery Society.

Work 
Rimdeika developed many plastic surgical techniques, gathered a group of qualified doctors for his department, and has been a manager and consultant for PhD candidates and post-doctoral scientists. 

He also was a research scientist, who led medical studies related to reconstructive surgery and wounds, and participated in many international projects and research projects. At international conferences, Rimdeika delivered over 300 lectures.

Rimdeika has been an editorial board member and reviewer of scientific journals such as  Medicina, European Journal of Plastic and Reconstructive Surgery, Lietuvos Chirurgija, Novosti Khirurgi, and EWMA Journal.

Memberships 
European Society of Plastic, Reconstructive and Aesthetic Surgery (ESPRAS) member of the board 2008–2018European Wound Management Association (EWMA), member of the board 2008 – 2014President of the Lithuanian Society of Plastic and Reconstructive Surgery 2016 - 2020 Representative of Lithuanian Society of Plastic and Reconstructive Surgery in many international eventsPresident of the Lithuanian Wound Healing Association 2005 – 2015Member of European Burns Association (EBA) Member of International Society of Burn Injuries (ISBI)

Pupillage 
Vishnevsky Institute of. Surgery (Russia)

Beverwijk Hospital and Euro Skin Bank (Netherlands)

Linköping University (Sweden)

Bochum University Hospital (Germany)

Vejle Hospital (Denmark)

Ghent University Hospital (Belgium) and many other medical centers.

Other activities 
From 2000–2014, he was a member of the board in Kaunas University of Medicine and member of the senate in Lithuanian University of Health Sciences.  He also  has been a member of numerous working groups in the Ministry of Health of the Republic of Lithuania. He has been adviser in health-related questions to the Mayor of Kaunas.

Awards 
 1999 and 2015 was awarded honorary diplomas by the minister of Health in Lithuania.
 2002 received "Gerumo plyta" ( "Gerumo kristalas“ ) award.
 2006 received "Sveikatos riteris“ award in Kaunas.
 2012 was awarded as an honoured doctor in Lithuania by the Ministry of Health of the Republic of Lithuania.

References

External links 
 PubMed search for Rytis Rimdeika
 Rytis Rimdeika at ResearchGate
 https://archive.today/20160615205400/https://lt.linkedin.com/in/rytis-rimdeika-2568509a
 https://www.youtube.com/watch?v=idVfArWFfgs
 http://www.yrasalis.lt/desimt/gydytojai/prof-dr-rytis-rimdeika/
 http://kauno.diena.lt/naujienos/kita/kita/plastinei-ir-rekonstrukcinei-chirurgijai-kaune-40-metu-417072

Lithuanian plastic surgeons
1966 births
Living people
Physicians from Kaunas
Lithuanian medical researchers